Bebe Wood is an American actress and singer. She is known for her roles as Shania in the NBC television series The New Normal, as Shannon on the ABC television series The Real O'Neals, and as Lake Meriwether on the Hulu Original series Love, Victor.

Early life
Wood was born in Kansas City, Missouri. She has said that she has wanted to be an actress since she was 3 years old and acted in her first television show when she was 10.

Filmography

Films

Television

Audio

Discography

Extended plays

References

External links 

 
 

Living people
Actresses from Kansas City, Missouri
American television actresses
American film actresses
American child actresses
21st-century American actresses